Deportee may refer to:

a deported person through deportation
Deportees (band), a Swedish musical band 
Deportee (film), 1976 dramatic short film by Sharron Miller
"Deportee (Plane Wreck at Los Gatos)", a protest song with lyrics by Woody Guthrie
The Deportees and Other Stories, a short story collection by Roddy Doyle